Desmond Dimbleby (11 September 1919 – 21 March 2008) was a South African cricketer. He played in twenty-one first-class matches from 1936/37 to 1949/50.

References

External links
 

1919 births
2008 deaths
South African cricketers
Eastern Province cricketers
Western Province cricketers
Cricketers from Cape Town